The Tour de Vineyards is a road cycling race held around Tasman Bay / Te Tai-o-Aorere, New Zealand. The race exists of both a men's and a women's competition over four stages. The race usually starts on New Year's Day, since the 2012–2013 edition after Christmas, ending however in the new year. Decisive is often the stage finishing on Takaka Hill. The 2014–2015 edition was the last one after 32 years.

Past winners

References
  (men)
  (women)

Cycle races in New Zealand
Recurring sporting events established in 2003
Men's road bicycle races
2003 establishments in New Zealand
Women's road bicycle races
Richmond, New Zealand
Sport in the Tasman District